The following is a chronological history of all local broadcasters of the Buffalo Sabres. Since 1997, radio and television broadcast production has been largely consolidated into the Sabres Hockey Network unit.

Television

2020s

2010s

Note: The "A" team covers all home games and approximately one third of away games. The "B" team covers the remaining two-thirds of the away games. Games against the Rangers, Devils or Islanders feature their studio hosts instead of the Sabres'.

2000s

1990s

1980s

1970s

Radio

2020s

2010s

2000s

1990s

1980s

1970s

Substitutes

Play-by-Play
Kevin Sylvester (2008–16)
Dan Dunleavy (2009–present)
Curt Keilback (2008–09)
Paul Hamilton (2008–09)
Jim Lorentz (1990–2007)
Mark Jeanneret (2010–11)

Color commentary
Mike Robitaille (?-2014)
Andrew Peters (2016–present)
Martin Biron (2016–present)

See also 
 List of current National Hockey League broadcasters

References

 
Buffalo Sabres
broadcasters
Prime Sports
Madison Square Garden Sports